Rachel Kirps (born 1 December 2005) is a Luxembourger footballer who plays as a midfielder for the youth team of Frauen-Regionalliga club FC Saarbrücken and the Luxembourg women's national team.

International career
Kirps made her senior debut for Luxembourg on 19 June 2022 during a 2–1 friendly win against Cape Verde.

References

2005 births
Living people
Women's association football midfielders
Luxembourgian women's footballers
Luxembourg women's international footballers